Andrew Hammelmann (born 9 May 1966) is an Australian cricketer. He played in one first-class match for Queensland in 1990/91.

See also
 List of Queensland first-class cricketers

References

External links
 

1966 births
Living people
Australian cricketers
Queensland cricketers
Cricketers from Brisbane